Williams Lake Water Aerodrome  was located  southeast of Williams Lake, British Columbia, Canada.

See also
Williams Lake Airport

References

Cariboo Regional District
Defunct seaplane bases in British Columbia